Charles Alvin Lisanby (January 22, 1924 – August 23, 2013) was an American Production Designer who helped define scenic design in early color television. 
During his career, he was nominated for sixteen Emmys and won three. In January 2010, Charles was inducted into the Academy of Television Arts and Sciences Hall of Fame at the nineteenth annual ceremony alongside Don Pardo, the Smothers Brothers, Bob Stewart, and Gene Roddenberry. Aside from his success in the entertainment industry, Charles is known for his close friendship with the artist Andy Warhol, which lasted for about ten years beginning in 1955.

Background
Charles was born to Rebecca Hollingsworth Lisanby and Charles Alvin Lisanby, Sr. in Princeton, Kentucky.  

He graduated high school in 1940, at age 16, and was drafted into the United States Army the following year after the entry of the United States into World War II.  Receiving an early discharge due to meningitis, Charles ignored his father's wishes for him to become a doctor and instead went to New York to attend art school.

His brother was retired United States Navy Rear Admiral James Lisanby ( 1928-2012), a former Chief of Engineers.

Influences in early color television
Charles Lisanby is currently the first and only Production Designer ever inducted into the Academy of Television Arts and Sciences Hall of Fame.  As well as contributing spectacular scenes and set piece design for countless television shows and movies, Charles helped pioneer several key recognizable features of television.  As color television developed, experimentation with colorful scenes and costumes was needed and developed.  One key feature Charles directly mastered was the use of neon lighting for shows.  Early experiments with neon lights created a buzzing sound through the microphone system which was severe enough it could not be used.  After working with engineers, lighting, and sound experts Charles was able to incorporate neon lights for the first time in television history.  Charles also invented lighted steps as a feature of shows, and was the first to implement large block letters which actors could sit on as a part of the set.

As well as influencing scenic design as it is known today, Charles designed the first ever mini-series on television in 1973–1974 with his Emmy-winning Ben Franklin mini-series.  He took scenic design to new heights with monumental set pieces such as his Parisian street set which created buzz across Hollywood and within the profession.  Throughout his nearly 50-year career, Lisanby became arguably the most influential scenic designer.

Career
Charles' first professional commission was given to him in 1947 when the Friars Club in New York City commissioned him to paint a mural in the dining room of their headquarters. Coincidentally Ralph Levy, who at the time worked for CBS, saw Charles' work and asked him to design the experimental made-for-television ballet "Billy the Kid". His work gained the attention of the Theatrical Stage Designers Union who demanded he cease working for CBS until he took a test to gain entrance into the Union. Charles passed the test with the highest marks and met the influential stage designer Oliver Messel who offered him a job as his assistant working on the Broadway show Romeo and Juliet starring Olivia de Havilland in 1951.

After Romeo and Juliet, Charles continued to work in the same scene shop for a year until he was offered a job by Jim McNaughton at ABC. In 1954 CBS offered him a job for twice the salary which he immediately took and worked on The Jane Froman Show. Charles' then worked for CBS for a number of years on such shows as the infamous $64,000 Question and Camera Three where he met Lewis Freedman, the future head of PBS and director of the National Endowment for the Arts.

In 1958 Charles was asked to work with Ralph Levy and Bob Banner on the Gary Moore Show where he worked for six years on 234 shows and helped give Carol Burnett her television debut. After the series ended Charles went on to work on the Kraft Music Hall for Smith/Hemion; and in 1973 and 1974 he designed the Ben Franklin miniseries and received his first Emmy. Starting in 1979 he began annually working on Radio City Music Hall's Christmas Spectacular which he continued designing until 1996.

Working on everything from made-for-television movies, musicals, ballets and Broadway shows, Lisanby influenced nearly every aspect of scenic design in all mediums which he worked.

Friendship with Andy Warhol
Charles met Andy Warhol at a party thrown by Bill Cecil in the mid-1950s in New York.  At the party Andy was sitting alone in the corner not socializing with anyone so Charles approached him to help him meet people.  The two began conversing and ended up leaving the party at the same time.  That particular night it was raining so Charles and Andy stood under the awning of a taxidermy shop where Charles pointed out that he liked a stuffed peacock in the window.  The next day the peacock was delivered to Charles' door and their great friendship began.

The two became nearly inseparable and met every Sunday to do figure drawings and studies which influence both artists greatly as they matured in their respective careers.  Warhol created an entire gallery exhibit (DETAILS) of the drawings he had done of Charles.  Although Charles' work had him travelling between the east and west coasts he and Andy kept in contact with regular phone calls.

In 1956 Charles and Andy took a month-long trip around the world which greatly influenced both of their work and directly inspired Warhol's Golden Shoes.  Charles came up with the title to Warhol's book 25 Cats Name Sam and One Blue Pussy and both artists frequently exchanged art and ideas into the early 1960s.

As Warhol began his famous pop-art movement, the two began to separate in their friendship as Charles did not wish to be a part of it.  Lisanby was in favor of much more realistic art and he decided that Warhol's famous The Factory was not his scene. Towards the end of the period where they were friends, Warhol bought a house and tried to get Charles to move in with him, and Andy even tried to give Charles one of his famous Marilyn Monroe prints that he made specifically for him. Lisanby refused the Marilyn even though Warhol famously said, "Wrap it up in brown paper. Put it in the back of a closet. One day it'll be worth a million dollars."

As Warhol gained more fame, he recognized the Pop Art movement that he was creating and the incredible fame he would achieve.  Andy asked Charles to join him in the movement and become a famous Pop artist as well, but Charles declined due to the work he was doing in his career in television.

The Charles Lisanby Collection
Charles donated his life's work to James Madison University in 2010.  Two years later the new James and Gladys Kemp Lisanby Museum in Festival Conference and Student Center held an exhibit to highlight Lisanby's most important contributions to the arts of television and scenic design, as well as introduce his relationship with Andy Warhol.  Mentor to an Icon: A Charles Lisanby and Andy Warhol Exhibit was on view from January 23, 2012 – March 2, 2012.  The exhibit was accompanied by a free iPad app that allowed visitors to interact with and learn more about the individual works exhibited as well as view interviews with and videos of and about Lisanby.

Death
Linasby died on August 23, 2013 at his Los Angeles, California home of complication following a fall at the age of 89.

Career timeline

References

External links
 
 Charles Lisanby Collection homepage
 Lisanby Hall of Fame Induction
 Academy of Television Arts and Sciences Biography

American production designers
1924 births
2013 deaths
People from Princeton, Kentucky
Accidental deaths from falls